Van Hall Larenstein, University of Applied Sciences, often abbreviated as VHL, is a vocational university in the Netherlands. It has locations in Leeuwarden and Velp (near Arnhem).

History

Since January 2003, there was an administrative merger between the Van Hall Institute (Leeuwarden) and IAH Larenstein (Velp/Deventer). The merger of the educational institutions was completed in October 2005, and got the name Van Hall Larenstein. In September 2006, the Deventer location moved to Wageningen, as Van Hall Larenstein became part of Wageningen University & Research. Since 2012, Van Hall Larenstein has been independent again. The location in Wageningen moved to Velp in 2015.
Van Hall Larenstein now has locations in Leeuwarden and Velp.

Study programmes
Van Hall Larenstein provides the following bachelor's programmes and master's programmes. In addition, Van Hall Larenstein offers various associate degree programs and courses.

Bachelor's programmes

Master's programmes

Photo gallery

External links

See also
 Wageningen University and Research
 Stoas University of Applied Sciences
 HAS University of Applied Sciences
 Van Hall Institute

Vocational universities in the Netherlands
Agricultural universities and colleges in the Netherlands
Wageningen University and Research
Education in Leeuwarden
Educational institutions established in 2003
2003 establishments in the Netherlands
Organisations based in Friesland